The 33rd Infantry Division was a formation of the U.S. Army National Guard between 1917 and 1968. Originally formed for service during World War I, the division fought along the Western Front during the Battle of Amiens, the Battle of Hamel, the Meuse-Argonne Offensive, at the Second Battle of the Somme, and at the Battle of Saint-Mihiel. It was re-formed during the inter-war period, and then later activated for service during World War II, seeing action against the Imperial Japanese Army in the Pacific. In the post war era, the division was reconstituted as an all-Illinois National Guard division. In the late 1960s, the division was reduced to a brigade-sized formation, and its lineage is currently perpetuated by the 33rd Infantry Brigade Combat Team.

World War I

Activated: July 1917 (National Guard Division from Illinois) at Camp Logan, Illinois
Overseas: May 1918.
Major operations: Le Hamel (four companies), Meuse-Argonne Offensive, Somme offensive, and Saint-Mihiel
Casualties: Total – 6,864 (KIA – 691, WIA  − 6,173).
Commanders: Brig. Gen. Henry D. Todd Jr. (19 September 1917), Maj. Gen. George Bell Jr. (7 December 1917).
Returned to U.S. and inactivated: May 1919 at Camp Grant, Illinois
Medal of Honor: 
 Sergeant Willie Sandlin, 
 Private Clayton K. Slack,
 Corporal Thomas A. Pope.
 Sergeant Sydney Gumpertz 
 Corporal Jake Allex
 First Sergeant Johannes S. Anderson

Involvement  
The 33rd Division served in World War I and beyond. The division was trained at Camp Logan in Houston, Texas as part of the National state guard in Illinois. The first unit went to France in 1918. The first unit to go into France was the 108th Engineers, under Colonel Henry A. Allen.

During World War I, the 33rd Division's officers included Second Lieutenant John Allan Wyeth, who has been called the only American poet of the Great War who can stand up to comparison with British war poets Siegfried Sassoon and Wilfred Owen. Wyeth later immortalized his war experiences with the 33rd U.S. Division in the 1928 sonnet sequence This Man's Army: A War in Fifty-Odd Sonnets.

On 20 and 21 June the division went to the Amiens sector, where there was expected to be a major German attack. The division was trained by British Army and Commonwealth soldiers – in particular the Australian Corps – and was part of some of their operations.

The first major battle in which elements of the 33rd Division took part was the Battle of Hamel on 4 July. Individual platoons from four companies from the 131st Infantry and 132nd Infantry were distributed among Australian battalions, to gain combat experience. This, however, occurred without official approval as there was controversy regarding the battlefield command of US troops by junior officers from other countries. Thus, while Hamel was a relatively minor battle by the standards of World War I, it was historically significant as the first occasion on which US Army personnel had fought alongside British Empire forces, and demonstrated that the previously inexperienced American troops could play an effective role in the war. The battle was also historically significant for the use of innovative assault tactics, devised by the Australian General John Monash, were demonstrated.

The 33rd Division was in reserve behind the British Fourth Army at the opening of the August offensive for emergencies only. With the British III Corps attack stalling at Chipilly Ridge during the Battle of Amiens, the 131st Regiment of the 33rd Division was sent to assist on 9 August, which it did with distinction. The following day the Regiment was attached to the 4th Australian Division and remained there until 12 August. From 12 August until 20 August it was combined with the 13th Australian Brigade in what was called the Liaison Force commanded by Brigadier General E. A. Wisdom. This was designed to hold the front from the Somme to the Bray-Sur-Somme to Corbie road to relieve the 4th Australian Division from the operation. After this it returned to the 33rd US Division.

On 23 August, the division was moved to the Toul sector. The 33rd Division fought in the Meuse-Argonne Campaign from 26 September 1918 to the end of the battle on 10 November 1918. The last mission in which the 33rd Division took part was on 27 December 1918.

In total, from the 33rd arriving in France to the German armistice on 11 November 1918, the division captured 13 units of heavy artillery and 87 pieces of light artillery. Also, they captured 460 machine guns and 430 light guns.  In total, the entire division gained 40,300 meters of land in World War I. The 33rd Division was the only unit in the war to have machine gun barrage enemy nests while infantry turned the position. In total, the 33rd Division received 215 American decorations, 56 British decorations, and various others.

As result of its World War I service, the division remains the only US Army division that has fought as part of British Army and French Army corps.

Order of battle

In 1918, the 33rd Division was organized as follows:

 Headquarters, 33rd Division
 65th Infantry Brigade
 129th Infantry Regiment
 130th Infantry Regiment
 123rd Machine Gun Battalion
 66th Infantry Brigade
 131st Infantry Regiment
 132nd Infantry Regiment
 124th Machine Gun Battalion
 58th Field Artillery Brigade
 122nd Field Artillery Regiment (75mm)
 123rd Field Artillery Regiment (155mm)
 124th Field Artillery Regiment (75mm)
 108th Trench Mortar Battery
122nd Machine Gun Battalion
 108th Engineer Regiment
 108th Field Signal Battalion
 Headquarters Troop, 33rd Division
 108th Train Headquarters & Military Police
 108th Ammunition Train
 108th Supply Train
 108th Engineer Train
 108th Sanitary Train
 129th, 130th, 131st, and 132nd Ambulance Companies and Field Hospitals

Inter-War Years
Three years after the end of the First World War the United States Congress passed the National Defense Act of 1920 providing for the reorganization of civilian components of the Army. Reserve forces were created, consisting of the National Guard and the Organized Reserve. This reorganization allowed for the reconstitution of the 33rd Infantry Division in Illinois, with most elements concentrated in the northern part of the state in and around Chicago. Regular Army officers were detailed to act as instructors for the 33rd, supervising National Guard officers who conducted the usual training. One of these officers was Colonel George C. Marshall, who supervised the 33rd from 1933 to 1936.  It contained:

 Headquarters, 33rd Division (Chicago)
 Headquarters, Special Troops, 33rd Division (Chicago)
 Headquarters Company, 33rd Division (Chicago)
 33rd Military Police Company (Chicago)
 33rd Signal Company (Chicago)
 108th Ordnance Company (Medium) (Chicago)
 33rd Tank Company (Light) (Maywood)
 65th Infantry Brigade (Pontiac)
 129th Infantry Regiment (Sycamore)
 130th Infantry Regiment (Delavan)
 66th Infantry Brigade (Chicago)
 131st Infantry Regiment (Chicago)
 132nd Infantry Regiment (Chicago)
 58th Field Artillery Brigade (Chicago)
 108th Ammunition Train (Illinois National Guard)
 122nd Field Artillery Regiment (75 mm) (Chicago)
 124th Field Artillery Regiment (75 mm) (Monmouth)
 123rd Field Artillery Regiment (155 mm) (Chicago)
 108th Engineer Regiment (Chicago)
 108th Medical Regiment (Chicago)
 108th Quartermaster Regiment (Chicago)

Italics indicates state of headquarters allocation; headquarters not organized or inactive.

World War II

Called into federal service: 5 March 1941 (National Guard Division from Illinois).
 Trained at Camp Essex in California in 1943.
Overseas: 7 July 1943.
Campaigns: New Guinea, Luzon.
 Presidential Unit Citation: 6.
Awards: Medal of Honor – 3 ; Distinguished Service Cross – 31 ; Distinguished Service Medal – 2; Silver Star – 470 ; Legion of Merit – 34; Soldier's Medal – 49; Bronze Star Medal – 2,251 ; Air Medal – 36.
Commanders: Maj. Gen. Samuel T. Lawton (March 1941 – May 1942), Maj. Gen. Frank Mahin (May–July 1942), Maj. Gen. John Millikin (August 1942 – September 1943), Maj. Gen. Percy W. Clarkson (October 1943 – November 1945); Brig. Gen. W. G. Skelton (November 1945 to inactivation).
Inactivated: 3 February 1946 in Japan.

Organization

The division, along with the other National Guard divisions with the exception of the 27th, was ordered to convert from the square to the triangular formation between January and February 1942. The 108th Engineers (Combat) Regiment was broken up on 12 February 1942 and the HQ, HQ and Service Company, and Companies A, B, and C became the 108th Engineer Combat Battalion, which remained with the division. The HQ, 1st Battalion was inactivated on 21 February 1942 and the 2nd Battalion became the 181st Battalion (Heavy Pontoon), an engineering unit.

The 132nd Infantry Regiment was detached on 14 January 1942 for service in New Caledonia with the Americal Division task force. On 21 February 1942 the division was re-designated the 33rd Infantry Division. That same day the 131st Infantry Regiment was detached for non-divisional service in the continental United States. The 129th Infantry Regiment was detached on 31 July 1943, and was later assigned to the 37th Infantry Division. The 136th Infantry Regiment, originally a Minnesota National Guard unit inactive during the interwar period, was reconstituted in the Army of the United States, activated with personnel transferred from elsewhere in the 33rd Infantry Division, and assigned to the division on 1 April 1942. The 123rd Infantry Regiment (unrelated in lineage to an earlier Alabama National Guard formation of the same designation that saw service in World War I as a part of the 31st Division) was constituted in the Army of the United States on 24 August 1942 and assigned to the division on 28 September 1942. The division served in the south Pacific, fighting in New Guinea and in the Philippines. In 1944-1945 the division contained:

Order of Battle

 Headquarters, 33rd Infantry Division
 123rd Infantry Regiment
 130th Infantry Regiment
 136th Infantry Regiment
 Headquarters and Headquarters Battery, 33rd Infantry Division Artillery
 122nd Field Artillery Battalion (105 mm)
 123rd Field Artillery Battalion (155 mm)
 124th Field Artillery Battalion (105 mm)
 210th Field Artillery Battalion (105 mm)
 108th Engineer Combat Battalion
 108th Medical Battalion
 33rd Cavalry Reconnaissance Troop (Mechanized)
 Headquarters, Special Troops, 33rd Infantry Division
 Headquarters Company, 33rd Division
 733rd Ordnance Light Maintenance Company
 33rd Quartermaster Company
 33rd Signal Company
 Military Police Platoon
 Band
 33rd Counterintelligence Corps Detachment

During its combat operations, divisions usually had various units attached in support of it and other organic units detached. Where those attachments and detachments are well-documented for the divisions that fought in the European Theater of Operations, documentation is poorer for those divisions which fought in the Pacific.

Reorganized

When the US Army reorganized from the "square" (4 regiments to a division) to "triangular" (3) concept, the 132nd Infantry Regiment was separated and was sent to New Caledonia as part of Task Force 6814 where it became part of the Americal Division. The division was left with the 123rd, 130th, and 136th Infantry Regiments. The 33rd Tank Company was sent to the Philippines as Company B of the 192nd Tank Battalion prior to Pearl Harbor and it was captured at Bataan.

Action in the Pacific Theater

The 33rd Infantry Division arrived in Hawaii on 12 July 1943. While guarding installations, it received training in jungle warfare. On 11 May 1944, it arrived in New Guinea where it received additional training. The 123rd Infantry Regiment arrived at Maffin Bay on 1 September, to provide perimeter defense around the Wakde Airdrome and in the Toem–Sarmi sector. The 123rd was relieved on 26 January 1945. Elements of the 33rd arrived at Morotai, on 18 December 1944 and landings were made on the west coast of the island on 22 December, without opposition and defensive perimeters were established. Aggressive patrols were sent out which encountered scattered resistance. The 33rd then landed at Lingayen Gulf, on Luzon, on 10 February 1945, and relieved the 43rd Infantry Division in the Damortis–Rosario Pozorrubio area, over the period 13–15 February. The division drove into the Caraballo Mountains on 19 February, toward its objective, Baguio, the summer capital of the Philippines and the headquarters of General Tomoyuki Yamashita.

Fighting against a fanatical enemy entrenched in the hills, the 33rd took Aringay on 7 March, Mount Calugong on 8 April, and Mount Mirador on 25 April. Baguio and Camp John Hay fell on 26 April, under the concerted attack of the 33rd and the 37th Infantry Divisions. Manuel Roxas, later President of the Philippines, was freed during the capture of Baguio, which was liberated by the 33rd and Filipino soldiers of the 66th Infantry Regiment, Philippine Commonwealth Army, USAFIP-NL on 27 April. After mopping up isolated pockets of Japanese troops, the division captured the San Nicholas–Tebbo–Itogon route on 12 May.  All elements went to rest and rehabilitation areas on 30 June 1945. The division landed on Honshū Island, Japan, on 25 September, and then performed occupation duties until it was deactivated in early 1946.

Casualties

Total battle casualties: 2,426
Killed in action: 396
Wounded in action: 2,024
Missing in action: 5
Prisoner of war: 1

Post World War II
The 33rd Infantry Division was reformed as an all-Illinois National Guard division on 7 November 1946. However, some of its former units were assigned to the 44th Infantry Division, which was also reorganized in the postwar Guard structure as an Illinois-based division.

By 1954, the division's infantry and artillery units included the 129th, 130th, and 131st Infantry Regiments, and the 122nd, 123rd, 124th, and 210th Field Artillery Battalions. A number of National Guard divisions were deactivated in 1968, including the 33rd Infantry Division on 1 February 1968. However, in its place the 33rd Infantry Brigade was organised. On 1 February 1968, the 178th Infantry Regiment was reorganized to consist of the 1st Battalion, an element of the 33rd Infantry Brigade. The 33rd Infantry Brigade Combat Team carries on the division's heritage, and circa 2010 was assigned to the 35th Infantry Division.

Notable members
Abel Davis, commanded the 132nd Infantry Regiment of the 33rd Division during World War I
Clayton K. Slack, served in 124th Machine Gun Battalion during World War I
Joseph B. Sanborn, commanded the 131st Infantry Regiment of the 33rd Division during World War I
Milton J. Foreman, Lieutenant General
Robert V. Connolly, Major served in the 123rd Infantry Regiment and commanded famed "Connolly Task Force" on Luzo
William Hood Simpson, General who commanded the Ninth United States Army in Europe from 1944−1945, served in numerous staff positions in the 33rd Division during World War I
Charles R. Forbes
John P. Lucas

References

Citations

Bibliography
Cioper, Nicole M. Prairie Division The Thirty-Third in the Great War, 1917–1919. Springfield, IL: Illinois State Military Museum, 1997. 
Daily, Edward L. 33rd Infantry Division: The Golden Cross Division. Paducah, Ky: Turner Pub, 1996. .  
Harris, Barnett W. and Dudley J. Nelson. 33rd Division Across No-Man's Land. Chicago, Ill.: R.R. Donnelley & Sons Co., 1919. 
Huidekoper, Frederic Louis. The History of the 33rd Division, A.E.F. Springfield, Ill: Illinois State Historical Library, 1921. 
Johnson, F.B. Phantom Warrior: The Heroic True Story of Pvt. John McKinney's One-Man Stand against the Japanese in World War II. New York : Berkeley Caliber, 2007.  
Montgomery, A.A. (Major General), The Story of the Fourth Army in the Battles of the Hundred Days, August 8th to November 11th, 1918, Hodder and Stoughton, London, 1919
Payan, Jack Louis. World War 1, 1918: Kankakee (Illinois) Doughboys, Company L, 129th Infantry, 33rd (Prairie) Division. [Palos Heights, Ill.]: J.L. Payan, 2008. 
Phipps, John R. A Short History of the 130th Infantry Regiment, 33d Infantry Division, Illinois National Guard. 1959. 
United States. The Golden Cross: A History of the 33rd Infantry Division in World War II. Nashville: Battery Press, 2000.  
Wilson, John B. (1997). Maneuver and Firepower: The Evolution of Divisions and Separate Brigades. Washington, DC: Center of Military History. 
Winston, Sanford H. The Golden Cross: A History of the 33rd Infantry Division in World War II. Washington [D.C.]: Infantry Journal Press, 1948. 
The Army Almanac: A Book of Facts Concerning the Army of the United States U.S. Government Printing Office, 1950.

External links

 33rd Infantry Division "The Prairie Division"
 33rd Infantry Division, "Golden Cross"
 Summary histories – 33rd Infantry Division
 33rd Infantry Division in Luxembourg

033d Infantry Division, U.S.
Infantry Division, U.S. 033d
Divisions of the United States Army National Guard
United States Army divisions of World War I
Infantry divisions of the United States Army in World War II
Military units and formations established in 1917
Military units and formations disestablished in 1968
1917 establishments in Illinois
1968 disestablishments in Illinois